Bolesławice may refer to the following places in Poland:
Bolesławice, Bolesławiec County in Lower Silesian Voivodeship (south-west Poland)
Bolesławice, Świdnica County in Lower Silesian Voivodeship (south-west Poland)
Bolesławice, Pomeranian Voivodeship (north Poland)
Bolesławice, West Pomeranian Voivodeship (north-west Poland)